José Ignacio Novoa Behovide (born December 20, 1955 in Irun) is a Spanish former handball player who competed in the 1980 Summer Olympics and in the 1984 Summer Olympics.

In 1980 he was part of the Spanish team which finished fifth in the Olympic tournament. He played five matches and scored three goals.

Four years later he finished eighth with the Spanish team in the 1984 Olympic tournament. He played all six matches and scored seven goals.

Notes

References

External links
 
 
 

1955 births
Living people
Spanish male handball players
Olympic handball players of Spain
Handball players at the 1980 Summer Olympics
Handball players at the 1984 Summer Olympics
Sportspeople from Irun
BM Granollers players
Handball players from the Basque Country (autonomous community)